The City of Armstrong is located in the North Okanagan of the Canadian province of British Columbia, between Vernon and Enderby. The town of Armstrong celebrated its centennial in 2013.

Location and history 
Armstrong is a rural community and commercial center in the North Okanagan, with agriculture, grain farming of alfalfa and corn, logging, and ranching being traditional economic activities. It is located amidst the dairy and farmlands of the Spallumcheen Valley (a name derived from a Shuswap language word with multiple meanings: "beautiful valley", "flat meadow", "meeting of the waters", and "prairie-banked river").

Armstrong was named after William Heaton Armstrong, a London banker who helped finance the Shuswap and Okanagan Railway in 1892 and local development at the turn of the century, relocating the townsite originally at Landsdowne to the confluence of the Valley's rail lines, and the city's current site.

The influence of Dutch immigrants settling in the valley after the Second World War is represented by their cheese-making knowledge, allowing Armstrong to become well known for the cheese it produced.

The city is also well known for hosting the Interior Provincial Exhibition and Stampede, which has been in annual operation since 1899 (however, the event was cancelled in 2020 and 2021 due to the COVID-19 pandemic). The "IPE" is not just a midway and popular retail show, but very much still a country fair, with contests being held to judge animals, cooking, sewing, hobbies, and other items. Additionally, the exhibition offers a variety of entertainment options ranging from concerts, competitions, and the famous mini-chuckwagon races.

Armstrong is a corporation operated by a seven-member city council headed by the Mayor, with meetings being held the second and fourth Mondays of every month. The Mayor is Chris Pieper, currently in his second term as mayor. He was preceded in his position by the prestigious Gerald "Jerry" Oglow.

Armstrong has four public education facilities; two elementary schools, a middle school, and a high school. Armstrong Elementary School was initially known as the "Armstrong Spallumcheen Consolidated School". When it was built in 1921, it was the first school in the Province to be constructed as a central school into which were consolidated approximately thirteen small country or one-room schools. Len Wood Middle school and Pleasant Valley Secondary were later added to suit the growing region, with Highland Park Elementary opening in 1983 to satisfy increasing demand and lack of suitable expansion capacity at Armstrong Elementary. There is also a store-front style facility, Gateway Continuing Education Centre, operated by School District 83.

Economy, tourist attractions, and activities 

While agriculture, logging, and ranching remain a dominant portion of the economy of Armstrong and the Spallumcheen Valley, tourism increasingly plays a significant role in the economic activity of the area; particularly popular with long-distance cyclists as a desirable location for short-haul excursions.

Museums and places of interest 

Armstrong and the surrounding area feature many attractions including museums, golf courses, water sports, snow sports including skiing and snowmobile riding, boating, fishing and hiking trails.
 The Armstrong-Spallumcheen Museum and Art Gallery, which is the site of the old Armstrong Machine Shop, has over thirty historical displays, replicas of the railways, a schoolhouse, a grocery store, a blacksmith shop, and a comprehensive archive of photographs, newspapers and maps.
 The Old School House is one of the original educational institutions in British Columbia.
 The Caravan Farm Theatre is where professional actors who have long provided entertainment throughout the Okanagan produce a number of annual events and festivals.
 Skiing and snowboarding: the Silver Star Mountain Resort is the most popular winter attraction area in the Okanagan Valley, with close proximity to Armstrong. Skiers and snowboarders take advantage of Silver Star Mountain where they have 2,491 feet (760 m) of vertical drop in which to defy gravity. Cross-country skiers also have a venue at Silver Star with 37 kilometers of tracked and groomed trails. In addition, there are 50 km of groomed trails that pass through the adjacent Sovereign Lake area.
 The Armstrong Farmer's Market, which runs outdoors weekly April to October, is a key attraction at the IPE Fairgrounds on Saturday mornings. A Winter Farmers Market also occurs at the Odd Fellows Hall on Bridge street in the off-season Thursdays from Noon to 5pm.
 The Okanagan and BC Rockies Circle Tour, takes tourists through the interior of British Columbia, north through the Okanagan to Sicamous, following Highway 1 into the mountains of the BC Rockies.
 The Armstrong skateboard park is a large attraction in the city of Armstrong, holding company jams and demos and bringing many people from all over B.C. An indoor park began operation in the fall of 2012 at the IPE Fairgrounds to offer youth year-round access to skating surfaces.
 Armstrong is home to two arenas, Nor Val Arena & Hassan Arena – Both Cater to community events, host Fabulous Fridays for Skating and Rollerblading. Are home to our Shamrock lacrosse, Knights Hockey, and Roller Derby.

Armstrong Cheese 

Armstrong Cheese is well known throughout Canada and in parts of the United States, and originated in Armstrong. Dairyworld purchased Armstrong Cheese in 1997. Saputo Inc. purchased Dairyworld in 2003, and in February 2004, after being in operation for more than 100 years, closed the Armstrong Cheese site down, laying off 73 workers. However, one of the main tourist attractions continues to be the Village Cheese Company. At the Village Cheese Company, one can watch master cheesemakers at their craft. Among the cheeses available are cheddar, Monterey Jack and "squeaky curds".

Climate
Armstrong has a humid continental climate (Köppen Dfb).

Demographics 

Ethnicity

Religion 
According to the 2021 census, religious groups in Armstrong included:
Irreligion (2,990 persons or 58.5%)
Christianity (2,000 persons or 39.1%)
Buddhism (15 persons or 0.3%)
Other (80 persons or 1.6%)

Education 
The public schools system is administered by School District 83 North Okanagan-Shuswap, headquartered in nearby Salmon Arm. Pleasant Valley Secondary School (PVSS) is the local high school and Len Wood Middle School is the middle school. There are two elementary schools; Highland Park Elementary, and Armstrong Elementary with students bussing in from nearby Falkland also making up a portion of the school population. The high-school is also getting a 16 million dollar gym renovation, after failed efforts by The former principal Chelsea Prince, The ministry of education has donated 16 million for the completion of the gym. The gym will be available to use by the community and the schools.

Sports

Notable people
 Theobald Butler Barrett, Canadian politician
 Shyla Stylez, pornographic actress
 Ina Forrest, Canadian Olympic wheelchair curler
Jackson Storm, Race car driver

Notes 

  https://web.archive.org/web/20060105192745/http://www.cityofarmstrong.bc.ca/siteengine/activepage.asp
  https://web.archive.org/web/20060112224327/http://www.britishcolumbia.com/regions/towns/?townID=3383
  http://www.library.ubc.ca/archives/pdfs/bchf/bch_2005_04.pdf
  https://web.archive.org/web/20060112224327/http://www.britishcolumbia.com/regions/towns/?townID=3383
  https://web.archive.org/web/20051221233226/http://www.cityofarmstrong.bc.ca/siteengine/activepage.asp?bhcp=1
  https://web.archive.org/web/20060112224327/http://www.britishcolumbia.com/regions/towns/?townID=3383
  https://web.archive.org/web/20051221233226/http://www.cityofarmstrong.bc.ca/siteengine/activepage.asp?bhcp=1
  https://web.archive.org/web/20060112224327/http://www.britishcolumbia.com/regions/towns/?townID=3383

Notes

References

External links

 
 

Cities in British Columbia
Populated places in the Regional District of North Okanagan
Populated places in the Okanagan Country